Old Finland is a name used for the areas that Russia gained from Sweden in the Great Northern War (1700–1721) and in the Russo-Swedish War (1741–1743). Old Finland was joined to the autonomous Grand Duchy of Finland as Viipuri Province in 1812.

History

In the Treaty of Nystad (1721) that concluded the Great Northern War, Sweden was forced to cede Käkisalmi County and Viborg/Viipuri County to Russia.  The ceded Finnish-speaking Ingria around Saint Petersburg, however, was not included in Old Finland.
In the Treaty of Åbo (1743) Sweden had to cede the areas in southern Karelia east of the Kymi river and around Savonlinna to Russia.

The area corresponded largely with that of the medieval province subjugated to Viipuri castle.

The Russian ruler guaranteed religion, property rights, old Swedish laws, and some privileges to the inhabitants of these territories.  However, a circumvention occurred, as the Russian administrators and Russian military were unfamiliar with the Swedish system.  The Russians were used to a different system with its serfs, serfdom. As a result, the economy of the area was markedly different from that on the other side of the border.

The ruler's guarantee froze the situation. Thus legal developments in Sweden were not introduced to these areas: the Viipuri and Käkisalmi territory did not adopt the 1734 General Law of Sweden (though Hamina (Fredrikshamn), Lappeenranta (Villmanstrand), and Savonlinna (Nyslott), at the time still Swedish, of course did adopt it), and the new constitution of King Gustav III was not implemented in the entire area.

The territories enjoyed a sort of autonomy and much particularism, since the Russian rulers applied similar principles here as in the Baltic Provinces.  The administration resembled a German principality, rather than a Russian province.

Under Russian rule the combined territories formed the Vyborg Governorate, or Government of Vyborg.

Ecclesiastically, the areas were administered as a diocese, but without a bishop. The church building in Viipuri and another in Hamina were assigned as cathedrals, with a diocesan chapter ("consistory"), led by the archdean.

The area was not forced to contribute men to the Russian Army until 1797. However, there were many non-Finnish troops in the area, especially after the 1788–90 war.

Scandinavian-style district courts continued in judicial function, each with a judge and lay members. However, the Russian estate owners and military often ignored these courts' decisions and imposed illegal punishments on the peasants.

Because of the absence of an evenly applied, up-to-date legal system in the area, apathy in some ways dominated among Old Finland's residents; and not many figures from the area have a prominent place in history. Two of these are Maximilian von Alopeus and his brother David Alopaeus, born into a Finnish family in Viipuri and both later serving many posts in Imperial administration, including ambassador in some Central European countries.

These areas, Government of Vyborg, were later referred to as Old Finland; and from the beginning of 1812, they were incorporated in the Grand Duchy of Finland, where the newly acquired provinces from Sweden were "New Finland".  The population in these provinces came to receive the same legal system as the rest of the Grand Duchy, including its Constitution and General Law, although some privileges took time to implement.  The so-called donated estates (owned by Russian noblemen) in Karelia were a headache resolved slowly by monetary compensation from the Grand Duchy's Treasury. This was a long lasting burden, as the last instance of compensation was not until the 1870s.

See also
Fief of Viborg
Finnish Karelia
History of the administrative division of Russia

Sources

Further reading
Viipurin läänin liittäminen muun Suomen yhteyteen, A. Danielsson-Kalmari

References

History of Karelia
Finland, Old